Novonikolayevsky (masculine), Novonikolayevskaya (feminine), or Novonikolayevskoye (neuter) is the name of several inhabited localities in Russia.

Urban localities
Novonikolayevsky, Volgograd Oblast, a work settlement in Novonikolayevsky District of Volgograd Oblast

Rural localities
Novonikolayevsky, Republic of Bashkortostan, a village in Naumovsky Selsoviet of Sterlitamaksky District of the Republic of Bashkortostan
Novonikolayevsky, Pochepsky District, Bryansk Oblast, a settlement in Milechsky Selsoviet of Pochepsky District of Bryansk Oblast
Novonikolayevsky, Vygonichsky District, Bryansk Oblast, a settlement in Khmelevsky Selsoviet of Vygonichsky District of Bryansk Oblast
Novonikolayevsky, Kursk Oblast, a settlement in Razvetyevsky Selsoviet of Zheleznogorsky District of Kursk Oblast
Novonikolayevsky, Nizhny Novgorod Oblast, a settlement in Kochkurovsky Selsoviet of Pochinkovsky District of Nizhny Novgorod Oblast
Novonikolayevsky, Martynovsky District, Rostov Oblast, a khutor in Rubashkinskoye Rural Settlement of Martynovsky District of Rostov Oblast
Novonikolayevsky, Tatsinsky District, Rostov Oblast, a khutor in Verkhneoblivskoye Rural Settlement of Tatsinsky District of Rostov Oblast
Novonikolayevsky, Verkhnedonskoy District, Rostov Oblast, a khutor in Shumilinskoye Rural Settlement of Verkhnedonskoy District of Rostov Oblast
Novonikolayevsky, Saratov Oblast, a settlement in Balakovsky District of Saratov Oblast
Novonikolayevsky, Republic of Tatarstan, a settlement in Zelenodolsky District of the Republic of Tatarstan
Novonikolayevsky, Voronezh Oblast, a khutor in Bodeyevskoye Rural Settlement of Liskinsky District of Voronezh Oblast
Novonikolayevskoye, Republic of Bashkortostan, a selo in Mrakovsky Selsoviet of Kugarchinsky District of the Republic of Bashkortostan
Novonikolayevskoye, Krasnoyarsk Krai, a village in Soloukhinsky Selsoviet of Pirovsky District of Krasnoyarsk Krai
Novonikolayevskoye, Novgorod Oblast, a village in Savinskoye Settlement of Novgorodsky District of Novgorod Oblast
Novonikolayevskoye, Vladimir Oblast, a village in Melenkovsky District of Vladimir Oblast
Novonikolayevskaya, a stanitsa in Novonikolayevsky Rural Okrug of Kalininsky District of Krasnodar Krai